Baynal (also Romanized as Bāynāl; also known as Bānīāl and Banīāl) is a village in Kongor Rural District, in the Central District of Kalaleh County, Golestan Province, Iran. At the 2006 census, its population was 1,225, in 234 families.

References 

Populated places in Kalaleh County